The 2000 Louisville Cardinals football team represented the University of Louisville in the 2000 NCAA Division I-A football season. The team, led by John L. Smith and played their home games in Papa John's Cardinal Stadium, ended with a 9–3 record.

Schedule

Roster

Rankings

References

Louisville
Louisville Cardinals football seasons
Conference USA football champion seasons
Louisville Cardinals football